One to One is the third album by British pop singer Howard Jones. It was released in October 1986. The album contains the singles "You Know I Love You... Don't You?" (US top twenty), "All I Want" (top 40 in many European countries) and "Little Bit of Snow" (top 75 in the UK). The CD release also contains the single version of "No One Is to Blame", a song included in its original form on Jones's previous album, Dream into Action, which had been re-recorded and released as a single earlier in 1986. This version features Phil Collins on drums and backing vocals. One to One reached number 10 in the UK Albums Chart.

Critical reception

The Rolling Stone Album Guide wrote that "Jones's songs take on a reflective cast, which neither helps their melodies nor enhances his singing." Trouser Press wrote that "the once-colorful elf has become part of a mainstream adult pop enterprise."

Track listing
All tracks written by Howard Jones.

Personnel

 Afrodiziak (Caron Wheeler, Claudia Fontaine, Naomi Osborne), Phil Collins, Cindy Mizelle, Doris Eugenio, Deborah Forman, Daramis Carbaugh, Marcus Miller, Mark Stevens, Fonzi Thornton, Mike Murphy, boys from the choir of St. Patrick's Cathedral, Dublin (conducted and directed by John Dexter) – backing vocals 
 Howard Jones – vocals, keyboards, synthesizers, drum programming, percussion programming, sequencing
 Mike Roarty – Fairlight CMI
 Steve Ferrone, Trevor Morais, Phil Collins – drums
 Phil Palmer, Nile Rodgers, Nick Moroch, Reb Beach – guitar
 Martin Jones (Howard's brother), Mo Foster – bass guitar 
 Bob Gay, Matthew Cornish, Kendall Crane, Scott Gilman – brass section
 Bob Gay – alto saxophone
 Arif Mardin – string arrangements on "Little Bit of Snow"
 Gene Orloff – string concertmaster
 Gary Burton – vibraphone
 Matt Malloy – flute and penny whistles
 Max Eastley – whirling instruments and the Arc
 Louise Lowry – tap dancing
 Mike Roarty and Kevin Killen – Quality Control technicians

Production 
Tracks 1−10
 Produced by Arif Mardin
 Engineered by Kevin Killen
 Assistant Engineers – Eddie Garcia (New York, NY) and John Grimes (Dublin, Ireland).
 Recorded at Windmill Lane Studios (Dublin, Ireland).
 Mixed at Atlantic Studios (New York, NY).
Track 11
 Produced by Phil Collins and Hugh Padgham
 Engineered by Hugh Padgham, assisted by Steve Chase and Paul Gomersall.
 Recorded at The Farm (Surrey, England).

Additional credits
 Cover photo – Chris Garnham
 Inside photos – Simon Fowler

Charts

Certifications

References

Howard Jones (English musician) albums
1986 albums
Albums produced by Hugh Padgham
Albums produced by Arif Mardin
Albums produced by Phil Collins
Asylum Records albums
Elektra Records albums